Frida Hyvönen (born Anna Frida Amanda Hyvönen; 30 December 1977) is a Swedish singer-songwriter.

Personal life
Hyvönen grew up in Robertsfors, located outside Umeå in the north of Sweden (which is also the hometown of her cousin Josephine Forsman's band Sahara Hotnights). Her Finnish grandfather was from Rovaniemi. She moved to Stockholm in 1995. Between 2010 and 2012, she resided in Paris. Today, she shares her time between Stockholm and her house in Västerbotten.

Career

Hyvönen's first record, Until Death Comes, was recorded at Stockholm's Atlantis Studios and co-produced with Jari Haapalainen of The Bear Quartet. The record was released in the EU in 2005 on The Concretes record label Licking Fingers, in the United States in 2006 on Secretly Canadian and in Australia in 2007 on Chapter Music. Hyvönen received the 2005 Stockholmspriset ("The Stockholm Prize") by the Swedish publication Nöjesguiden for her debut album. Her first single, "I Drive My Friend", climbed the hit-list in Sweden for a few weeks.

In the fall of 2005, Frida wrote music for dance performance PUDEL, by choreographer Dorte Olesen. She also performed the music live on stage at Dansens Hus in Stockholm. The music was recorded in 2006 and released in January 2007.

In spring 2006, she toured the United Kingdom with José González, and in summer 2006 she toured the US with fellow Swedish artist Jens Lekman.

Hyvönen's next album, "Silence is Wild", was released on 29 October 2008 in Scandinavia and 4 November 2008 in North America and Australia. Once again, Jari Haapalainen was co-producing with Hyvönen. The album was critically acclaimed, and resulted in Hyvönen winning "Kulturpriset" ("The Culture Prize") in 2009, given by Swedish newspaper Dagens Nyheter.

The same year, she was the first Swedish pop artist invited to play a show at Dramaten, the Royal Theatre in Stockholm, and also, she completed a collaboration with photographer Elin Berge, "Drottninglandet". The project consisted of a book of photos by Berge, with an accompanying CD of instrumental music composed and performed by Hyvonen. The book followed women from Thailand, living in the north of Sweden.

In 2012 Hyvönen - for the third time together with Haapalainen - recorded the Album "To the Soul" in Benny Andersson's new studio Riksmixningsverket at Skeppsholmen in Stockholm. Engineer was Linn Fijal.

Frida recorded and released music for a second photo book with Elin Berge, "Kungariket" in 2015, this time turning their eye towards Swedish men in Thailand.

In 2016, Frida wrote her first album in Swedish, "Kvinnor och Barn", which was lifted to the sky by critics, and earned her 2 Grammis Awards in the categories "Lyricist" and "Composer". The album was co-produced with Tobias Fröberg.

In 2017, she composed and arranged music for a theatre play, "ILYA", by director Lars Rudolfsson, at the Stockholm City Theatre.

The same year, she revisited Dramaten together with First Aid Kit, Annika Norlin, Loney, Dear, among others, to perform a tribute to Leonard Cohen. The show was broadcast on Swedish Television.

Hyvönen's new album "Dream of Independence" will be released in March 2021 by RMV Grammofon. It was recorded at Riksmixningsverket with engineer Linn Fijal.

Covers

In autumn 2007, Frida recorded a cover of the R.E.M. song "Everybody Hurts", released in digital form by Stereogum
She also covered the song "Sista dan tillsammans" together with Mattias Alkberg on Dubbel Trubbel, a tribute to Olle Adolphson.
Her cover of Judee Sill's "Jesus Was A Crossmaker", was released in September 2009, by label American Dust, as part of  Crayon Angel: A Tribute to the Music of Judee Sill. In November 2010, she interpreted the poem "Neeijjj" on the compilation Sonja Åkesson tolkad av….

Style

Frida Hyvönen's music is piano and vocal driven, with a main focus on the melody and lyrics, which are often reminiscent of short stories. She covers subjects like funerals, breastfeeding, fertility, modernity, art, war, eating disorders, travels, abusive relationships, the economics of love, becoming a parent, the creative process. Live, she performs solo with grand piano, or more often, as a trio, with two other musicians. Among the musicians that have played in Frida's band are Linnea Olsson, Tammy Karlsson, Sarah Frey, Daniel Bingert, Amanda Lindgren, Marlene Johansson-Erlandsson, Jari Haapalainen, Anna Bergvall and Anna Lund.

Discography

Albums

Singles
2005: "I Drive My Friend", Licking Fingers/Playground.
2008: "Traveling Companion" (Marit Bergman featuring Frida Hyvönen),Sugartoy Recordings.
2012: "Terribly Dark"

Part of compilations
2005: "Sista dan tillsammans" (in compilation Dubbeltrubbel), EMI.
2009: "Jesus was a crossmaker" (in compilation Crayon Angel: A Tribute to the Music of Judee Sill), American Dust.
2010: "Neeijjj", (in compilation Sonja Åkesson tolkad av...), Playground Music.

References

Hopper, Jessica. "Frida Hyvonen unafraid of mixing music, feminism". Chicago Tribune 9 March 2007. Accessed 12 August 2007.

External links
Homepage
Facebook Fan Page
Frida Hyvönen on Secretly Canadian

1977 births
Living people
People from Robertsfors Municipality
Swedish people of Finnish descent
Swedish songwriters
21st-century Swedish singers
21st-century Swedish women singers
Secretly Canadian artists
Musikförläggarnas pris winners